State Highway 84 runs in Erode district and Karur district of Tamil Nadu, India. It connects the towns of Erode and Karur.

Route 
The highway passes through kolanalli, Vengampudur, Kodumudi, Noyyal to a length of 61 km.

Major junctions 

 National Highway 381A at Solar, Erode
 Erode Ring Road near Lakkapuram
 State Highway 190 at Karumandampalayam
 State Highway 189 at Kodumudi
 State Highway 190 at Salaipudur
 National Highway NH-81 (Old NH-67) at Karur
 National Highway NH-44 (Old NH-7) at Karur

References

State highways in Tamil Nadu
Transport in Erode